A Yank on the Burma Road is a 1942 drama film directed by George B. Seitz and starring Laraine Day, Barry Nelson and Keye Luke. It is also known as China Caravan and Yanks on the Burma Road.

It was produced as part of a cluster of Hollywood films set during the Burma campaign of World War II. Although released shortly after America's entry into the conflict, it was largely produced before the Attack on Pearl Harbor. The film's sets were designed by the art director Edwin B. Willis.

Synopsis
A New York taxi driver Joe Tracey attracts public attention by capturing the Spinaldi brothers, two notorious killers, and handing them over to the police. He is then hired by Chinese representatives who want him to take a valuable convoy of medical supplies on the Burma Road from Rangoon to the Republic of China's capital at Chungking. There he meets fellow American Gail Farwood who has been denied permission to travel to Chungking because the British authorities suspect her on account of her German-born pilot husband of being pro-Japanese agent. Tracey agrees to take Gail with him, but is surprised at her attempts to evade the Chinese authorities. Having originally taken the job purely for the money, Tracey is moved by the suffering and resolve he encounters on the way. They come across Gail's husband Tom, in the custody of the Chinese, and agree to take him to Chungking for trial. On the way a fierce battle breaks out between the Japanese attackers and Chinese forces, during which Tom is killed trying to aid the former. The attack is repulsed and the convoy proceeds on its way, news having arrived that America has now entered the war following the bombing of Pearl Harbor.

Reception
The film made $355,000 in the United States and Canada and $197,000 elsewhere, making a profit of $64,000.

Cast

 Laraine Day as Mrs. Gail Farwood
 Barry Nelson as 	Joe Tracey
 Stuart Crawford as 	Tom Farwood
 Keye Luke as 	Kim How
 Victor Sen Yung as 	Wing 
 Philip Ahn as 	Dr. Franklin Ling 
 Knox Manning as Radio Announcer
 Matthew Boulton as 	Rangoon Aide de camp
 James B. Leong as Guerilla Leader 
 Marcelle Corday as Madame Vercheron
 George Magrill as A Spinaldi Brother 
 Cy Schindell as A Spinaldi Brother
 Eddy Chandler as 	Police Desk Sergeant Mulvaney 
 Cliff Clark as Police Lieutenant 
 James Flavin as 	Police Radio Dispatcher
 Luke Chan as Officer
 Richard Loo as 	Commandant 
 Allen Jung as Taxi Driver
 Chester Gan as Doctor 
 Harry Semels as 	Partner
 Bob Okazaki as 	Japanese Officer
 Eddie Lee as 	Chinese Lieutenant

References

Bibliography
 Selth, Andrew. Burma, Kipling and Western Music: The Riff from Mandalay. Taylor & Francis,  2016.
 Loukides, Paul & Fuller, Linda K. Beyond the Stars: Stock Characters in American Popular Film. Popular Press, 1990.

External links

A Yank on the Burma Road at TCMDB

1942 films
Metro-Goldwyn-Mayer films
1940s war drama films
American war drama films
World War II films made in wartime
Films set in Myanmar
Trucker films
1940s adventure drama films
American black-and-white films
1940s drama road movies
Films directed by George B. Seitz
Films scored by Lennie Hayton
American adventure drama films
American drama road movies
1942 drama films
1940s English-language films